Felling is the process of cutting trees in a logging operation.

Felling may also refer to:

Felling, Tyne and Wear, an urban area in England
Felling, a village and part of Hardegg in Austria
Felling, the process by which a felled seam is produced
Donna M. Felling (born 1950), American politician and nurse